The Transalpine Pipeline (TAL) is a crude oil pipeline, which connects Italy, Austria and Germany.

History
The feasibility study of the pipeline was carried out by Bechtel in 1963. The pipeline was commissioned in 1967. This time, the construction cost around US$192 million.

Route
The pipeline starts from the marine terminal in Trieste. In Vohburg, the Transalpine Pipeline is connected with the Ingolstadt-Kralupy-Litvínov pipeline, which supplies oil refineries in the Czech Republic. It could be used to reverse the southern branch of the Druzhba pipeline to supply Slovakia.

In Würmlach, Austria, the Adria-Wien Pipeline (AWP) branches off from the Transalpine Pipeline. It supplies the OMV refinery in Schwechat. Through the proposed Bratislava - Schwechat Pipeline it may supply also Slovakia.

In addition to the sea transport, the Pan-European Pipeline, if constructed, will supply the Transalpine Pipeline.

Technical features
The pipeline has ten pumping stations. The pipeline system includes tank farms in Trieste and Lenting, Germany. The capacity of the pipeline is approximately 43 million tons of crude oil per year. In 2012 the throughput of the pipeline was 34.9 million tons of crude oil.

Pipeline company
The pipeline is owned by the consortium of eight oil companies. The current (outdated?) shareholders are:
OMV (25%)
Royal Dutch Shell (24%)
ExxonMobil (16%)
Ruhr Oel (11%)
Eni (10%)
BP (9%)
ConocoPhillips (3%)
Total S.A. (2%)

The Czech unit of PKN Orlen, Unipetrol, is negotiating to buy an about 2% in the pipeline.

The shareholders of the Group include: OMV, Shell, Rosneft, ENI, C-BLUE B.V. (Gunvor), ExxonMobil, Mero, Phillips 66/Jet Tankstellen and Total.

See also

 South European Pipeline

References

External links
The Transalpine Pipeline Company

Energy infrastructure completed in 1967
Oil pipelines in Italy
Oil pipelines in Austria
Oil pipelines in Germany
Buildings and structures in Friuli-Venezia Giulia
Austria–Germany relations
Austria–Italy relations
Germany–Italy relations